Tandubas, officially the Municipality of Tandubas,  is a 2nd class municipality in the province of Tawi-Tawi, Philippines. According to the 2020 census, it has a population of 34,316 people.

Etymology
The word Tandubas coined from two Malay words Tanjung Bas. Tanjung means “place”, while the word Bas means “Landing”. Therefore, Tandubas means a place of landing, referring to a group of Malaysian traders who sailed across many islands and landed on an island what is now Tandubas Island. Seeing the abundance of resources to sustain their living, this group of Malaysian traders finally decided to settle on that island and named it as Tanjung Bas.

For many years, the island had been named as Tanjung Bas. The Malaysian word Tanjung has its equivalent in Sama dialect which is Tandu. The name Tanjungbas has been changed by the natives to Tandubas, a name that was used from generation to generation.

History
Tandubas had been a part of the Sultanate of Sulu prior to the creation of Sulu as a province under the Republic of the Philippines. When the province of Sulu was created, Tandubas was one of the Districts, an administrative sub-division of the then Department of Education under the Division of Sulu. By virtue of Executive Order No. 355, dated July 1, 1958, Tandubas was converted to a Municipality under the Province of Sulu, covering areas now under the municipality of Sapa-Sapa, the municipality of Languyan, an area in the mainland of Tawi-Tawi. When the Province of Tawi-Tawi was created by virtue of Presidential Decree No. 302, dated September 27, 1973, the Municipality of Tandubas became one of the municipalities in the Province of Tawi-Tawi.

By 2008, the municipality celebrated its Golden Anniversary. In a bid to create more local government units that comprise the Province of Tawi-Tawi, the Municipality of Sapa-Sapa was created entirely from Tandubas Municipality. Also the Municipality of Languyan was created partly out of the territorial jurisdiction of the Municipality of Tandubas, thus greatly reducing the land area of the mother municipality. This was made possible by virtue of Presidential Decree No. 1086.

Geography
The Municipality of Tandubas is located in the north-eastern part of the province of Tawi-Tawi. It is bounded in the north by Languyan Municipality and Sulu Sea; south by Celebes Sea; east by Municipality of South Ubian: and west by Municipality of Sapa-Sapa.

From Bongao it is accessible by water transportation. Travel time from the port of Bongao to the Municipality of Tandubas takes about five (5) hours using a motor launch with an average speed. For a speedboat or a fast craft it will only take about an hour.

Barangays
Tandubas is politically subdivided into 20 barangays. 

12 barangays are located on the island of Tandubas (Tongbangkaw, Tapian, Ballak, Kakoong, Tangngah, Silantup, Butun, Kepeng, Sallangan, Tapian Sokah, Sibakloon and Sapa); 2 barangays are located on Tingungun Island (Kalang-kalang and Salamat); 1 barangay is located at Naungan Island (barangay Naungan); 2 barangays are located on Tandubato island (Lahay-Lahay and Tandubato); 2 barangays are located on Tawitawi Island (Himba and Baliongan), and 1 barangay located on Taruk Island (Barangay Taruk).

Climate

Demographics

Economy

References

External links
 Tandubas Profile at PhilAtlas.com
 [ Philippine Standard Geographic Code]
 Tandubas Profile at the DTI Cities and Municipalities Competitive Index
 Philippine Census Information

Municipalities of Tawi-Tawi
Establishments by Philippine executive order